Emmanuel Pío (born 4 November 1988 in Baradero) is an Argentine football midfielder who plays for Unión San Felipe in the Chilean First Division B.

Career
Pío made his first team debut for Banfield in a 3-2 win over Argentinos Juniors on 29 March 2008, he has since established himself as a regular player in the Banfield team.

In 2009, he was member of the squad that won the Apertura 2009 championship appearing in 6 games. On 13 December 2009 he celebrated with his teammates when Banfield won the Argentine championship for the first time in the history of the club.

Honours
Banfield
Primera División Argentina: Apertura 2009

External links
 Emmanuel Pío at BDFA.com.ar 
 Emmanuel Pío – Argentine Primera statistics at Fútbol XXI 

1988 births
Living people
Sportspeople from Buenos Aires Province
Argentine footballers
Association football midfielders
Club Atlético Banfield footballers
Club Atlético Tigre footballers
Unión San Felipe footballers
Primera B de Chile players
Argentine Primera División players
Expatriate footballers in Chile